This is a list of medical colleges controlled by the government of Tamil Nadu in the Indian state of Tamil Nadu. All colleges are funded and run by government of Tamil Nadu.There are 46 medical colleges in the state. All of these colleges listed below are affiliated with the Tamil Nadu Dr. M.G.R. Medical University. It includes modern medicine, Dental and AYUSH medical colleges.

Government Medical Colleges (Modern Medicine)

Government Medical College (DENTAL)

Government Medical Colleges (AYUSH)

References 
 Tamil Nadu laid foundation for record 11 Medical Colleges in 2019 - 2020

Government Medical College
Lists of medical colleges in India

Medical Colleges
Government universities and colleges in India